The South Plains Association of Governments (SPAG) is a voluntary association of cities, counties and special districts in the South Plains region of Texas.

Based in Lubbock, the South Plains Association of Governments is a member of the Texas Association of Regional Councils.

Counties served
Bailey
Cochran
Crosby
Dickens
Floyd
Garza
Hale
Hockley
King
Lamb
Lubbock
Lynn
Motley
Terry
Yoakum

Largest cities in the region
Lubbock
Plainview
Levelland
Brownfield
Littlefield
Slaton
Muleshoe

References

External links
South Plains Association of Governments - Official site.

Texas Association of Regional Councils